The United States ambassador to Saint Vincent and the Grenadines is the official representative of the government of the United States to the government of Saint Vincent and the Grenadines. The ambassador is the United States ambassador to Barbados and the Eastern Caribbean, resident in Bridgetown, Barbados, and is concurrently the ambassador to Antigua and Barbuda, Barbados, Dominica, Grenada, St. Kitts and Nevis, and St. Lucia.

No U.S. mission has ever been established at Kingstown. All diplomatic functions are handled out of the U.S. embassy at Bridgetown, Barbados, where the U.S. ambassador to Saint Vincent and the Grenadines is resident.

List of U.S. ambassadors to Saint Vincent and the Grenadines
The following is a list of U.S. ambassadors, or other chiefs of mission, to Saint Vincent and the Grenadines. The title given by the United States State Department to this position is currently Ambassador Extraordinary and Plenipotentiary.

See also
Saint Vincent and the Grenadines – United States relations
Foreign relations of Saint Vincent and the Grenadines
Ambassadors of the United States

References

United States Department of State: Background notes on Saint Vincent and the Grenadines

External links
 United States Department of State: Chiefs of Mission for Saint Vincent and the Grenadines
 United States Department of State: Saint Vincent and the Grenadines
 United States Embassy in Bridgetown

 01
United States
Saint Vincent and the Grenadines
Saint Vincent